Sinclair Park, also known as Sinclair Heights, was a segregated community in Bremerton, Washington. It was built as a housing project during World War II and was demolished in 1948.

History 
At the onset of World War II, the Puget Sound Naval Shipyard in Bremerton processed large numbers of incoming workers, nearly quintupling Bremerton's population. In response to the suddenly increased demand for housing, the city established a housing authority and began building a series of housing projects for the workers. The rapid expansion included substantial diversification of the area. Between 1940 and 1945, the number of Black residents in Bremerton grew from just seven to 4,500. As the city grew more diverse, the number of racist incidents also increased.

In 1943, Sinclair Park was constructed, consisting of 280 homes overlooking Sinclair Inlet. The community became racially segregated almost immediately; a policy that was commonplace in defense housing developments. While the segregation was never explicitly codified, by 1944 over 80% of Black families placed in city housing were placed in Sinclair Park. The community did not have bus service and was several miles from the closest grocers' and schools. The few businesses that were close to the area would sometimes charge higher prices to Sinclair Park's residents and the local property manager delegated maintenance to the residents themselves, unlike other Bremerton housing projects at the time.

Every housing development built in this time included a community center. Sinclair Park's community center, nicknamed "The Armory," was one of the first buildings designed by NBBJ. Jazz musician Quincy Jones, whose father had moved their family to Sinclair Park for work, first played piano at the community center. Jones later described the experience in his autobiography, saying "That's where I began to find peace. I was eleven. I knew this was it for me. Forever."

Legacy 
After World War II ended, all housing projects developed by the city for shipyard workers were desegrated, including Sinclair Park. In 1947 some of the homes were sold to veterans under the condition they were removed from the site and transported elsewhere, however, few were ultimately purchased. The following year the houses left standing were demolished and the community center was repurposed as an armory for the Washington National Guard before being demolished itself in 2002. A photo collage wall at the Bremerton Readiness Center depicts Sinclair Park.

References

External links 

 Sinclair Project at the Kitsap County Historical Society

Bremerton, Washington
1943 establishments in Washington (state)
1948 disestablishments in Washington (state)
African-American segregation in the United States